Franck Mailleux (born 27 May 1985 in Saint-Malo) is a French racing driver. He has competed in such series as Eurocup Formula Renault 2.0 and the Formula Three Euroseries. He was champion of the 2006 Winter Series in the British Formula Renault Championship.

Racing record

Complete FIA World Endurance Championship results
(key) (Races in bold indicate pole position) (Races in italics indicate fastest lap)

* Season still in progress.

24 Hours of Le Mans results

References

External links
 
 

1985 births
Living people
French racing drivers
Formula Renault Eurocup drivers
French Formula Renault 2.0 drivers
Formula 3 Euro Series drivers
Sportspeople from Saint-Malo
European Le Mans Series drivers
American Le Mans Series drivers
24 Hours of Le Mans drivers
Nürburgring 24 Hours drivers
FIA World Endurance Championship drivers
24H Series drivers
Manor Motorsport drivers

Signature Team drivers
Morand Racing drivers
SG Formula drivers
Tech 1 Racing drivers
TDS Racing drivers
Eurocup Mégane Trophy drivers
Volkswagen Motorsport drivers